Firuzabad County is in Fars province, Iran. The capital of the county is the city of Firuzabad. At the 2006 census, the county's population was 111,973 in 24,894 households. The following census in 2011 counted 119,721 people in 30,724 households. At the 2016 census, the county's population was 121,417 in 37,453 households.

Administrative divisions

The population history of Firuzabad County's administrative divisions over three consecutive censuses is shown in the following table. The latest census shows two districts, five rural districts, and two cities.

References

 

Counties of Fars Province